Dewi Claire Schreefel (born 12 November 1985) is a Dutch professional golfer currently playing on the LPGA Tour and formerly on the Futures Tour.

Personal
Schreefel was born in Alkmaar, Netherlands on 12 November 1985. She resides in the village of Diepenveen located within the municipality of Deventer. Her father is Indonesian and her mother is Dutch.

Amateur and college career
As a junior player, Schreefel won the Dutch Stroke-Play Championship five times, in 1999, 2000, 2002, 2003 and 2004. She also won the 2004 Italian Women's Amateur Championship and the Dutch Match-Play Championship. She attended the University of Southern California where she was a member of the 2008 NCAA National Championship team, was the 2006 NCAA Individual champion, a three-time All-American and finished in the top-10 14 times. She had three wins during her college career.  She graduated with a bachelor's degree in sociology.

Schreefel was part of the Dutch team finishing silver medalists at the 2008 European Ladies' Team Championship after host nation Sweden at Stenungsund Golf Club. She also played for the Netherlands five times in a row at the Espirito Santo Trophy, last time in 2008 in Adelaide, Australia.

Professional career
Schreefel turned professional in 2008, and joined the Futures Tour on 27 January 2009. She had one win on the Futures Tour in her rookie season and finished tenth on the season-ending money list to earn LPGA Tour status for 2010, although she was unable to gain entry into any LPGA events in 2010 because of her low status on the LPGA priority list and she played a second full season on the Futures Tour that year. She finished tied for fourth place in the LPGA Final Qualifying Tournament on 12 December 2010 to earn full playing status on the LPGA for 2011.

Professional wins (2)

Ladies European Tour wins (1)

Futures Tour wins (1)

Results in LPGA majors
Results not in chronological order before 2015.

^ The Evian Championship was added as a major in 2013

CUT = missed the half-way cut
"T" = tied

Team appearances
Amateur
European Girls' Team Championship (representing Netherlands): 1999, 2000
Junior Ryder Cup (representing Europe): 2002 (winners)
Junior Solheim Cup (representing Europe): 2002, 2003 (winners)
European Ladies' Team Championship (representing Netherlands): 2001, 2003, 2005, 2007, 2008
Espirito Santo Trophy (representing Netherlands): 2000, 2002, 2004, 2006, 2008

References

External links

Profile at the University of Southern California sports site 

Dutch female golfers
USC Trojans women's golfers
LPGA Tour golfers
Ladies European Tour golfers
Sportspeople from Alkmaar
Sportspeople from Deventer
1985 births
Living people